The 2022 North Tyneside Metropolitan Borough Council election took place on 5 May 2022. One third of councillors—20 out of 60—on North Tyneside Metropolitan Borough Council were elected. The election took place alongside other local elections across the United Kingdom.

In the previous council election in 2021, the Labour Party maintained its control of the council, holding 50 seats after the election, with nine other councillors from the Conservative Party.

Background 

The Local Government Act 1972 created a two-tier system of metropolitan counties and districts covering Greater Manchester, Merseyside, South Yorkshire, Tyne and Wear, the West Midlands, and West Yorkshire starting in 1974. North Tyneside was a district of the Tyne and Wear metropolitan county. The Local Government Act 1985 abolished the metropolitan counties, with metropolitan districts taking on most of their powers as metropolitan boroughs. The North of Tyne Combined Authority was created in 2018 and began electing the mayor of the North of Tyne from 2019, which was given strategic powers covering a region covering some of the same area as the former Tyne and Wear metropolitan county, as well as Northumberland.

Since its creation, North Tyneside has generally been under Labour control, with some periods of no overall control and Conservative Party control from 2008 to 2010. Labour has had an overall majority of seats on the council since the 2011 election, when the party gained seats. In the most recent council election in 2021, Labour won eighteen seats with 48.6% of the vote to hold 50 overall, while the Conservatives won five seats with 35.7% of the vote to hold nine seats overall. The Green Party received 7.1% of the vote and the Liberal Democrats received 6.2% of the vote but neither party won any seats. North Tyneside has had a single authority mayor since 2001, a position which has been held by Labour and Conservative politicians. Most recently, Norma Redfearn has been the Labour mayor of North Tyneside since 2013, and she was last re-elected in 2021.

The positions up for election in 2021 were last elected in 2018. In that election, Labour won eighteen seats on 56.8% of the vote while the Conservatives won two seats with 31.8% of the vote. The Liberal Democrats received 5.9% of the vote but didn't win any seats.

Electoral process 
The council elects its councillors in thirds, with a third being up for election every year for three years, with no election in the fourth year. The election will take place by first-past-the-post voting, with all wards being represented by three councillors, one of whom is elected each election year to serve a four-year term.

All registered electors (British, Irish, Commonwealth and European Union citizens) living in North Tyneside aged 18 or over will be entitled to vote in the election. People who live at two addresses in different councils, such as university students with different term-time and holiday addresses, are entitled to be registered for and vote in elections in both local authorities. Voting in-person at polling stations will take place from 07:00 to 22:00 on election day, and voters will be able to apply for postal votes or proxy votes in advance of the election.

Previous council composition

Results summary

Ward Results

Battle Hill

Benton

Camperdown

Chirton

Collingwood

Cullercoats

Howdon

Killingworth

Longbenton

Monkseaton North

Monkseaton South

Northumberland

Preston

Riverside

St Mary's

Tynemouth

Valley

Wallsend

Weetslade

Whitley Bay

References 

North Tyneside Council elections
North Tyneside